Uranyl formate (UO2(CHO2)2·H2O) is a salt that exists as a fine yellow free-flowing powder occasionally used in transmission electron microscopy.

It is occasionally used as a 0.5% or 1% aqueous negative stain in transmission electron microscopy (TEM) because it shows a finer grain structure than uranyl acetate. However, uranyl formate does not easily go into solution, and once dissolved, has a rather limited lifetime as a stain. It is quite sensitive to light, especially ultraviolet light, and will precipitate if exposed.

See also
Electron microscope

References 
2SPI.com , compound information, retrieved May 3, 2011.

Electron microscopy stains
Uranyl compounds
Nuclear materials
Formates